The redear sunfish (Lepomis microlophus), also known as the shellcracker, Georgia bream, cherry gill, chinquapin, improved bream, rouge ear sunfish and sun perch) is a freshwater fish in the family Centrarchidae and is native to the southeastern United States. Since it is a popular sport fish, it has been introduced to bodies of water all over North America. It is known for its diet of mollusks and snails.

Description

The redear sunfish generally resembles the bluegill except for coloration and somewhat larger size. The redear sunfish also has faint vertical bars traveling downwards from its dorsal. It is dark-colored dorsally and yellow-green ventrally. The male has a cherry-red edge on its operculum; females have orange coloration in this area.

Habitat and range
Redear sunfish are native to the Southeast U.S.  They range from North Carolina to Florida, west to southern Illinois and Missouri, and south to the Rio Grande drainage in Texas. However, this fish has also been widely introduced to other locations in the United States outside of its native range.

In the wild, the redear sunfish inhabits warm, quiet waters of lakes, ponds, streams, and reservoirs. They prefer to be near logs and vegetation, and tend to congregate in groups around these features. This sunfish is also located in many freshwater marsh wetlands.

Diet
The favorite food of this species is snails, which it obtains by cracking their shells, hence this feisty gamefish's common name: shellcracker.  These fish meander along lakebeds, seeking and cracking open snails and other shelled creatures. VanderKooy et al. (2000) observed that large L. microlophus predominantly focus on hard-shelled prey such as ostracods, hydrobiid snails and mussels throughout the entire year. In the same field investigation, it was observed that smaller fish tended to also consume zooplankton, amphipods, chironomid and ceratopongonid larvae and cladocerans, with varied distributions depending on the season. They are also believed to feed on algae, aquatic worms, copepoda, midge larvae, ephemeropteran and odonata nymphs, crayfish, small fish, and fish eggs. Redears have thick pharyngeal teeth (hard, movable plates in its throat) which allow it to crunch exoskeletons. It is even capable of opening small clams. The specialization of this species for the deep-water, mollusk-feeding niche allows it to be introduced to lakes without the risk of competition with fish that prefer shallower water or surface-feeding. In recent years, the stocking of redear has found new allies due to the fish's ability to eat quagga mussels, a prominent invasive species in many freshwater drainages.

Reproduction

During spawning, males congregate and create nests close together in colonies, and females visit to lay eggs. The redear sometimes hybridizes with other sunfish species.

Fossil record
The redear sunfish is the first-known species of Centrarchidae based on fossil records, as old as 16.3 million years, dating back to the Middle Miocene.

Relationship with humans 
Redear sunfish is a popular panfish among recreational anglers. The IGFA all-tackle world record for the species stands at  caught in 2014 from Lake Havasu in Arizona.

References

External links

 GLANSIS Species FactSheet

Lepomis
Fish described in 1859
Taxa named by Albert Günther
Freshwater fish of the Southeastern United States
Extant Miocene first appearances
Freshwater fish of North America